is a Japanese football player for FC Osaka.

Playing career
Yuta Inagaki joined to J3 League club; FC Machida Zelvia in 2014. In 2016, he moved to MIO Biwako Shiga, making the move permanent in January 2017.

Club statistics
Updated to 1 January 2020.

References

External links

1992 births
Living people
Kansai University of International Studies alumni
Association football people from Hyōgo Prefecture
Japanese footballers
J3 League players
Japan Football League players
FC Machida Zelvia players
MIO Biwako Shiga players
Fujieda MYFC players
FC Osaka players
Association football midfielders